Tony Temple (born September 13, 1985) is a former starting running back for the Missouri Tigers football team representing the University of Missouri. Temple played for the Tigers from 2004 to 2007. He entered the 2008 NFL Draft, but was not chosen and was signed after the draft as a free agent with the Cleveland Browns

High school career
Temple attended Rockhurst High School in Kansas City, Missouri, and participated in both track and field and football for the Hawklets. Temple was on two Missouri 6A High School undefeated state championship football teams in 2000 and 2002. Temple finished his high school career in football with 6,295 rushing yards and 85 total touchdowns, good for a #8 ranking by Rivals and #2 by ESPN as a running back prospect in the 2004 collegiate recruiting class.

Collegiate career
In his final collegiate game, Temple set a Cotton Bowl Classic record with 281 yards rushing in Missouri's 38-7 win over Arkansas on New Year's Day 2008, breaking a mark that Dicky Maegle first set with a memorable performance in 1954. On his final carry of the game, Temple broke loose for a spinning, tackle-breaking 40-yard touchdown run and then rode to the bench on the arms of teammates Chase Daniel and lineman Tyler Luellen because he had tweaked a hamstring injury. Temple's rushing mark and total touchdowns (4) remain Cotton Bowl Classic records.

After the 2007 season Temple applied to get the 2008 year of eligibility back by appeal to the NCAA. Temple played in one game for 2004 as a true freshman, but due to an injury, he missed the remainder of the year. The appeal was turned down initially by the Big 12, and before the NCAA could review it, Temple decided to withdraw the appeal and prepare for the NFL draft.

Post-college
Temple was signed with the Cleveland Browns, and released after a short stint in the NFL which led to a dynamic career as a wellness provider. Temple established Temple Made Fitness in 2016, a wellness company that has evolved into a premiere sports performance training provider and community wellness advocate which provides holistic wellness to children through schools and community centers. 

He has provided thousands of children and families with health and wellness education, mental health, and behavioral strategies through fun community events, short and long-term health programming, along with healthy eating experiences.

In 2020 Temple co-authored a wellness workbook with his daughter Stori, Animal Movements Wellness Workbook. The Animal Movement Wellness Workbook has been a catalyst for introducing and deepening the understanding of movement, mental health journaling, positive self-talk, healthy eating, and family bonding through imaginary animal activities. Thousands of children have been gifted the Animal Movements Wellness Workbook through local community partnerships.

The Temple Made Foundation was established in 2021 to expand and deepen the health and wellness efforts by Temple in areas that are underfunded, underresourced, and undervalued.

References
Tony Temple #22 Mizzou Tigers biography

1985 births
Living people
Players of American football from Kansas City, Missouri
American football running backs
Missouri Tigers football players
Cleveland Browns players